There are more than 9,000 Grade I listed buildings in England. This page is a list of these buildings in the county of Northamptonshire, by local government district. The districts prior to April 2021 are in brackets.

North Northamptonshire (Corby)

|}

West Northamptonshire (Daventry)

|}

North Northamptonshire (East Northamptonshire)

|}

North Northamptonshire (Kettering)

|}

West Northamptonshire (Northampton)

|}

West Northamptonshire (South Northamptonshire)

|}

North Northamptonshire (Wellingborough)

|}

See also
Grade II* listed buildings in Northamptonshire

Notes

References 
National Heritage List for England

External links

 
Northamptonshire
Lists of listed buildings in Northamptonshire